Red Queen Productions is a Toronto-based, Canadian cinema company founded by filmmakers Maya Gallus and Justine Pimlott, dedicated to creating films about women, social issues, culture and the arts.  Their films have screened internationally at Sheffield Doc/Fest,  Dok Leipzig,  SEOUL International Women’s Film Festival,  Women Make Waves (Taiwan),  This Human World Film Festival (Vienna),  Singapore International Film Festival,  Frameline Film Festival (San Francisco),  Outfest (LA) and Newfest (New York), among others, and have been broadcast around the world. Their work has won numerous awards, including a Gemini Award for Best Direction for Girl Inside.

Films

Awards and nominations

Bay Street Film Festival
 2014: People’s Choice Award: Derby Crazy Love (Award)

Canadian Screen Awards
2014: Best Editing in a Documentary: Derby Crazy Love (Nomination)
2012: Best Editing in a Documentary: The Mystery of Mazo de la Roche (Nomination)
2012: Best Cinematography in a Documentary: The Mystery of Mazo de la Roche (Nomination)
2012: Barbara Sears Documentary Award: The Mystery of Mazo de la Roche (Nomination)

Canadian Cinema Editors Awards 
2014: Best Editing: Derby Crazy Love (Nomination)
2012: Best Editing: The Mystery of Mazo de la Roche (Nomination)
2011: Best Editing: Dish-Women, Waitressing & the Art of Service (Nomination)

Gemini Awards 
 2010: Best Editing in a Documentary – Dish, Women, Waitressing & the Art of Service (Nomination)
 2008: Best Direction in a Documentary - Girl Inside (Award)
 2008: Donald Brittain Award for Best Social Political Documentary – Girl Inside (Nomination)
 2004: Best Direction in a Documentary Series – 2 eps: The Boxers Heart & Battle of the Titans - Punch Like A Girl (Nomination)

Inside Out Film and Video Festival 
 2005: Best Documentary– Fag Hags: Women Who Love Gay Men (Award)

Reel Out Film Festival
 2006: Best Canadian Film – Fag Hags: Women Who Love Gay Men (Award)

Sheffield Adventure Film Festival
 2015: Best Women in Adventure Film, Bronze: Derby Crazy Love (Sheffield, UK)[12] (Award)
 2015: Best Soundtrack, Gold: Derby Crazy Love (Sheffield, UK)[13] (Award)
 2015: Special Jury Citation, Best Film: Derby Crazy Love (Sheffield, UK)

Yorkton Film Festival, Golden Sheaf Awards
 2011: Best Social Political Documentary - The Mystery of Mazo de la Roche (Award)

References

External links
 

Film production companies of Canada
Companies based in Toronto